Home to Roost is a British sitcom produced by Yorkshire Television between 19 April 1985 and 19 January 1990. Written by Eric Chappell, it stars John Thaw as Henry Willows and Reece Dinsdale as his teenaged son Matthew.

The premise is that Henry Willows, a 40-something who has been divorced from his wife for seven years and is perfectly happy living alone in London until his oldest child, Matthew arrives to live with him after being thrown out by his mother. The episodes generally revolve around Henry's annoyance at having his solitude disturbed and the age gap between father and son. Henry employs two cleaners during the show's life; first Enid Thompson and in the third series, Fiona Fennell.

The show's theme tune is Lionel Bart's "Consider Yourself" from Oliver!, arranged in a jazz style by Peter Knight.

The series was later repeated on Channel 4, ITV3 and Forces TV. All 29 episodes have now been released on DVD by the Network imprint.

Main cast
John Thaw as Henry Willows - Henry is a divorced middle-aged man who lives by himself, but when his son, Matthew, turns up on his door step, expecting to be waited on hand and foot, his life is turned upside down.
Reece Dinsdale as Matthew Willows - Matthew is a teenager who gets himself into trouble, and is obsessed with girls and money.
Elizabeth Bennett as Enid Thompson - Enid is Henry's first cleaner. She is nosey and appears to be attracted to Henry.
Joan Blackham as Fiona Fennell - Fiona is Henry's second cleaner.
Rebecca Lacey as Julie Willows - Julie is Henry's daughter and Matthew's sister. Despite living with her mother after her parents' divorce she appears to be a daddy's girl.
Sheila Hancock - Sue Willows - Henry's ex-wife. She only appears in one episode. Hancock is the real-life wife (widow as of 2002) of Thaw.

Series Overview

Series 1: 19 April 1985 to 31 May 1985 (7 Episodes)
Series 2: 5 September 1986 to 17 October 1986 (7 Episodes)
Series 3: 24 October 1987 to 5 December 1987 (7 Episodes)
Christmas Special: 27 December 1987 (1 Episode)
Series 4: 1 December 1989 to 19 January 1990 (7 Episodes)

Episode list

Series 1 (1985)

Series 2 (1986)

Series 3 (1987)

1987 Christmas Special

Series 4 (1989-1990)

Foreign versions
The US version, You Again? was less successful and lasted two seasons, totalling 26 episodes. Elizabeth Bennett reprised the role of Enid in the show.
The Dutch version, Ha, die Pa! (Hello, Dad!) ran from 1990 to 1993 and was broadcast by NCRV. Luc Lutz (1924-2001) and his son Joris starred as Norbert and Matthijs Hoogendijk. Keeping it in the family, Pieter Lutz (1927-2009) guested as the homeless old man in the adaptation of the 'Getting on?!' episode. Matthijs' sister Freddie was played by Bettina Berger.

External links
.
.

1985 British television series debuts
1990 British television series endings
1980s British sitcoms
1990s British sitcoms
ITV sitcoms
Television series by Yorkshire Television
Television shows set in London
Television series by ITV Studios
English-language television shows